Beck is a British television mystery series, first broadcast on 2 October 1996, that ran for a total of six episodes on BBC1. The series starred Amanda Redman as the title character, Beck, who runs Locate, a missing persons agency based in Kings Cross, London. The series co-starred Caroline Loncq, David Hunt, David Herlihy and William Ash. All six episodes were written by Paul Hines, with Ken Grieve, Maurice Phillips and James Hazeldine each directing two episodes.

Notably, Redman began a relationship with director Maurice Phillips while working together on the show. A review from The Independent said of the series; "Beck, the new private dick series, is set in this world of whores, pimps, addicts and runaways. It features our old friend, gritty realism, so there is vomit on the floor again and a dosser on every doorstep." A second series was confirmed to have been in the works at the time of broadcast, although it never materialised. Notably, the series has never been released on DVD.

Cast 
 Amanda Redman as Beck; private detective and owner of 'Locate', a missing persons agency
 Caroline Loncq as Therese
 David Hunt as Mick Farrant
 David Herlihy as Tally
 Nigel Clauzel as Muffy
 William Ash as Ralph
 Timothy Gleed as Joe
 Camilla Power as Charity

Episodes

References

External links 
 

1996 British television series debuts
1996 British television series endings
1990s British crime television series
1990s British drama television series
BBC television dramas
1990s British television miniseries
English-language television shows
Television shows set in London
1990s British mystery television series